The Road: Part II (Lost Highway) is the debut mixtape by British electronic music act Unkle, released on 29 March 2019. The album has been described by James Lavelle as a mixtape more than an actual album, consisting of songs recorded before and during The Road: Part I sessions.

Track listing

Disc 1 
 "Iter VI: Prologue" – 0:04
 "Requiem (When You Talk Love)" (featuring Mark Lanegan) – 4:15
 "Ar.Mour" (Album Version) (featuring Elliott Power and Miink) – 4:38
 "Iter VII: Lost" – 0:14
 "The Other Side" (featuring Tom Smith and Philip Sheppard) – 4:09
 "Feel More / With Less" – 6:02 (featuring Liela Moss, Miink & Philip Sheppard)
 "Nothing to Give" – 3:51
 "Iter VIII: However Vast the Darkness" – 0:22
 "Long Gone" – 5:50
 "Only You" (featuring Wil Malone) – 5:12
 "The First Time Ever I Saw Your Face" (featuring Keaton Henson) – 5:15

Disc 2 
 "Iter IX: Epilogue / Tales of the City" – 0:19
 "Crucifixion / A Prophet" – 7:17
 "Powder Man" (featuring Chris Goss & Twiggy) – 3:22
 "Kubrick" (featuring Mick Jones) – 7:33
 "Sun (The)" – 2:29
 "Find an Outsider" – 4:54
 "Iter X: Found" – 0:14
 "Days And Nights" – 4:34
 "Reprise" – 3:15
 "Iter XI: In Your Arms" – 1:06
 "Touch Me" (featuring Liela Moss) – 5:54 (originally by Rui da Silva)

Charts

References

2019 albums
Unkle albums